The El-Shams Stadium (Egyptian Pronunciation: Estad El Shams) is a multi-use stadium with an all-seated capacity of 15,000 located in Cairo Governorate, Egypt. It is the home for El Shams SC and was used as a training center by Ivory Coast at the 2019 Africa Cup of Nations.

References

Stadiums in Cairo
Football venues in Egypt
Football in Cairo